Ringaudas Bronislovas Songaila (20 April 1929 – 25 June 2019) was an official of the Lithuanian SSR nomenclatura. In 1987–1988, he was the First Secretary of the Communist Party of Lithuania or the de facto head of state.

Biography
Songaila was born in Klaipėda. He graduated from a veterinary school and within five years became a deputy of the Minister of Agriculture. In 1962, at the age of 33, he became Minister of Production of Agricultural Products and Resources. In agriculture, he worked on increasing the size of kolkhozs (collective farms), increasing centralization and specialization of agricultural production, elimination of khutors (single homesteads), and implementation of land improvements. Songaila was a member of the Central Committee of the Communist Party of Lithuania (1962–1981), Chairman of the Council of Ministers (1981–1985; equivalent to Prime Minister), Chairman of the Presidium of the Supreme Soviet of the Lithuanian SSR (1985–1987; de jure head of state), and First Secretary of the Communist Party of Lithuania (December 1987 – October 1988; de facto head of state). 

He was described as a "bland" and indecisive but loyal communist who stayed away from political intrigues and showed interest only in agricultural matters. When Songaila ordered KGB and Internal Troops to forcibly disperse a rally of the radical pro-independence Lithuanian Liberty League on 28 September 1988, he was forced to resign one month later. He was replaced by Algirdas Brazauskas, who supported Sąjūdis movement and Lithuania's declaration of independence in March 1990.

After the resignation, Songaila retired from public life and died on 25 June 2019 at the age of 90. He was buried in the Antakalnis Cemetery in Vilnius.

References

1929 births
2019 deaths
People from Klaipėda
Communist Party of the Soviet Union members
Members of the Supreme Soviet of the Soviet Union
First Secretaries of the Communist Party of Lithuania
Members of the Supreme Soviet of the Lithuanian Soviet Socialist Republic
Heads of government of the Lithuanian Soviet Socialist Republic
Ministers of Agriculture of Lithuania
Burials at Antakalnis Cemetery
Heads of state of the Lithuanian Soviet Socialist Republic